Devario annandalei is a species of fish of the family Cyprinidae found in the Salween, Chao Phraya, and Mekong river basins in Myanmar and Thailand. It grows to  standard length.

References

External links
 Devario annandalei

Devario
Cyprinid fish of Asia
Fish of Myanmar
Fish of Thailand
Fish described in 1908
Taxa named by Banawari Lal Chaudhuri